The Church and the Homosexual is a 1976 book by theologian John J. McNeill. The book is notable in the field of moral theology in that it was among the first books to argue that the Bible does not condemn homosexuality.

Summary
McNeill examines and challenges the Catholic Church's official, traditional attitude toward homosexuality which condemns the practice as a violation of God's divine law. He also seeks to establish that the Bible does not condemn homosexuality.

See also
Homosexuality and Roman Catholicism

References

External links
The Church and the Homosexual

1976 non-fiction books
Books about Christianity
Works about LGBT and Catholicism